This is a partial or incomplete list of places in countries other than Ireland named after places in Ireland.

Massive emigration, often called the Irish diaspora, from Ireland in the 19th and 20th centuries resulted in many towns and regions being named or renamed after places in Ireland.

The following place names sometimes share strong ties with the original place name. Places named for Irish words but which are not current or historical places in Ireland are excluded.

Common placenames in multiple countries

Antrim

Antrim, New Hampshire
Antrim, Nova Scotia
Antrim, Ohio
Antrim, Pennsylvania
Antrim County, Michigan
Antrim Township, Franklin County, Pennsylvania
Antrim Township, Michigan
Antrim Township, Watonwan County, Minnesota
Antrim Township, Wyandot County, Ohio

Ardmore

Ardmore, Alberta
Ardmore, New Zealand
Ardmore, Alabama
Ardmore, Atlanta, Georgia (Neighborhood)
Ardmore Historic District, Winston-Salem, North Carolina (Neighborhood)
Ardmore, Indiana
Ardmore, Maryland
Ardmore, Missouri
Ardmore, Oklahoma
Ardmore, Pennsylvania
Ardmore, South Dakota
Ardmore, Tennessee

Athlone

Athlone, California
Athlone, Cape Town 
Athlone, Edmonton, Alberta (Neighborhood)
Athlone, Victoria
Athlone Park, South Africa

Avoca

Avoca, Arkansas
Avoca, Florida
Avoca, Indiana
Avoca, Iowa
Avoca, Louisville, Kentucky (Neighborhood)
Avoca, Minnesota
Avoca, Nebraska
Avoca, New South Wales
Avoca, New York
Avoca, New Zealand
Avoca, Pennsylvania
Avoca, Queensland
Avoca, South Africa
Avoca, Tasmania
Avoca, Texas
Avoca, Victoria
Avoca, West Virginia
Avoca, Wisconsin
Avoca Beach, New South Wales 
Avoca Dell, South Australia
Avoca Lake, New South Wales
Avoca River, Canterbury, New Zealand
Avoca River, Hawke's Bay, New Zealand
Avoca River, Victoria
Avoca Township, Livingston County, Illinois
North Avoca, New South Wales

Bangor

 Bangor, Alabama
 Bangor, California
 Bangor, Gwynedd
 Bangor, Iowa
 Bangor, Maine
 Bangor, Michigan
 Bangor, Morbihan
 Bangor, New South Wales
 Bangor, New York
 Bangor, Nova Scotia
 Bangor, Pennsylvania
 Bangor, Saskatchewan
 Bangor, Tasmania
 Bangor, Wisconsin
 Bangor Township, Bay County, Michigan
 Bangor Township, Marshall County, Iowa
 Bangor Township, Pope County, Minnesota
 Bangor Township, Van Buren County, Michigan

Belfast

Belfast, California
Belfast, Clermont County, Ohio
Belfast, Georgia
Belfast, Highland County, Ohio
Belfast, Maine
Belfast, Missouri
Belfast, Mpumalanga
Belfast, Nebraska
Belfast, New York
Belfast, New Zealand
Belfast, Pennsylvania
Belfast, Prince Edward Island
Belfast, Tennessee
Belfast Township, Fulton County, Pennsylvania
Belfast Township, Murray County, Minnesota

Boyle

Boyle, Alberta
Boyle, Kansas
Boyle, Mississippi
Boyle County, Kentucky

Bray

Bray, Berkshire
Bray, Botswana
Bray, Eure
Bray, North West
Bray, Oklahoma
Bray, Saône-et-Loire
Bray, South Australia
Bray-Dunes, Nord
Bray-en-Val, Loiret
Bray-et-Lû, Val-d'Oise
Bray Island, Nunavut
Bray-lès-Mareuil, Somme
Bray-Saint-Christophe, Aisne
Bray Shop, Cornwall
Bray-sur-Seine, Seine-et-Marne
Bray-sur-Somme, Somme
Bray Township, Pennington County, Minnesota
Brays, Missouri
Pays de Bray, Normandy
River Bray, North Devon

Cashel

Cashel, Ontario
Cashel, Zimbabwe
Cashel Township, Swift County, Minnesota
Tudor and Cashel Township, Ontario (Canada)

Cavan

Cavan, Côtes-d'Armor
Cavan, New South Wales
Cavan, Ontario
Cavan, South Australia

Clare

Clare, Illinois
Clare, Indiana
Clare, Iowa
Clare, Kansas
Clare, Michigan
Clare, Mpumalanga
Clare, New York
Clare, Nova Scotia
Clare, South Australia
Clare, Suffolk
Clare County, Michigan
Clare Mountain Range, Antarctica
Clare Valley, South Australia
Point Clare, New South Wales

Clontarf

Clontarf, Minnesota
Clontarf, New South Wales
Clontarf, Queensland (Moreton Bay Region)
Clontarf, Queensland (Toowoomba Region)

Coleraine/Colerain/Colrain

Colerain, North Carolina
 Colerain, Ohio
 Colerain Township, Bedford County, Pennsylvania
 Colerain Township, Belmont County, Ohio
 Colerain Township, Hamilton County, Ohio
 Colerain Township, Lancaster County, Pennsylvania
 Colerain Township, Ross County, Ohio
 Coleraine, Minnesota
 Coleraine, Ontario
 Coleraine, Victoria
 Colrain, Massachusetts
 Saint-Joseph-de-Coleraine, Quebec

Derry

Derry, Louisiana
Derry, New Hampshire
Derry, New Mexico
Derry, Oregon
Derry, Pennsylvania
Derry Downs (England)
Derry Township, Dauphin County, Pennsylvania
Derry Township, Mifflin County, Pennsylvania
Derry Township, Montour County, Pennsylvania
Derry Township, Pike County, Illinois
Derry Township, Westmoreland County, Pennsylvania

Dublin

Dublin, Alabama
Dublin, Banana Islands 
Dublin, Belarus
Dublin, California
Dublin, Florida
Dublin, Georgia
Dublin, Indiana
Dublin, Kentucky
Dublin, Maryland
Dublin, Missouri
Dublin, New Hampshire
Dublin, North Carolina
Dublin, Ohio
Dublin, Pennsylvania
Dublin, South Australia
Dublin, Texas
Dublin, Virginia
Dublin Township, Swift County, Minnesota
Dublin Township, Mercer County, Ohio
Dublin Township, Fulton County, Pennsylvania
Dublin Township, Huntingdon County, Pennsylvania
Upper Dublin Township, Montgomery County, Pennsylvania

Donegal

Donegal, Bonnechere Valley, Ontario
Donegal, North Perth, Ontario 
Donegal, Pennsylvania
Donegal Township, Butler County, Pennsylvania
Donegal Township, Washington County, Pennsylvania
Donegal Township, Westmoreland County, Pennsylvania
East Donegal Township, Lancaster County, Pennsylvania
West Donegal Township, Lancaster County, Pennsylvania

Dunmore

Dunmor, Kentucky
Dunmore, Alberta
Dunmore, Falkirk 
Dunmore, New South Wales
Dunmore, Pennsylvania
Dunmore, Queensland 
Dunmore, West Virginia
Dunmore Town, Bahamas
Lake Dunmore, Addison County, Vermont

Erin (Anglicised version of Éire, meaning Ireland)

 Érin, France
 Erin, New York
 Erin, Ontario
 Erin, Tennessee
 Erin, Texas
 Erin, Wisconsin
 Erin Lake, Minnesota
Erin Estates, Alberta
 Port Erin, Isle of Man

Fingal

Fingal, North Dakota
Fingal, Ontario
Fingal, Tasmania
Fingal, Victoria
Fingal Bay, New South Wales
Fingal Head, New South Wales
Finghall, North Yorkshire

Ireland

Ireland, Bedfordshire
Ireland, Indiana
Ireland, Nova Scotia
Ireland, West Virginia
Ireland Island, Bermuda
New Ireland, Papua New Guinea
New Ireland Province, Papua New Guinea

Kildare

Kildare, Edmonton, Alberta (Neighborhood)
Kildare, Oklahoma
Kildare, Texas
Kildare, Wisconsin
Kildare Capes, Prince Edward Island
Saint-Ambroise-de-Kildare, Quebec
Sainte-Marcelline-de-Kildare, Quebec

Kilkenny

Kilkenny, Edmonton, Alberta (Neighborhood)
Kilkenny, Minnesota
Kilkenny, New Hampshire
Kilkenny, South Australia
Kilkenny Township, Le Sueur County, Minnesota

Killarney

Killarney, Calgary, Alberta (Neighborhood)
Killarney, Edmonton, Alberta (Neighborhood)
Killarney, Florida
Killarney, Gauteng 
Killarney, Georgia
Killarney, Manitoba
Killarney, Ontario
Killarney, Queensland
Killarney, Vancouver, British Columbia (Neighborhood)
Killarney, Victoria 
Killarney, Zimbabwe
Killarney Heights, New South Wales
Killarney Station, Northern Territory, Australia
Killarney Vale, New South Wales

Limerick

Limerick, Georgia
Limerick, Louisville, Kentucky (Neighborhood)
Limerick, Maine
Limerick, Ontario 
Limerick, Saskatchewan
Limerick Township, Pennsylvania
New Limerick, Maine

Londonderry

Cape Londonderry (Australia)
Londonderry, Edmonton, Alberta (Neighborhood)
Londonderry, Guernsey County, Ohio
Londonderry, New Hampshire
Londonderry, New South Wales
Londonderry, North Yorkshire 
Londonderry, Nova Scotia
Londonderry, Ross County, Ohio
Londonderry, Vermont
Londonderry, West Midlands
Londonderry Island (Chile)
Londonderry Township, Bedford County, Pennsylvania
Londonderry Township, Chester County, Pennsylvania
Londonderry Township, Dauphin County, Pennsylvania
Londonderry Township, Ohio
North Londonderry Township, Pennsylvania
South Londonderry, Vermont
South Londonderry Township, Pennsylvania

Longford

Longford, Coventry
Longford, Derbyshire
Longford, Gloucestershire
Longford, Greater Manchester
Longford, Hillingdon
Longford, Kansas
Longford, Market Drayton
Longford, Newport
Longford, Ontario
Longford, Tasmania
Longford, U.S. Virgin Islands
Longford, Victoria 
Longford, Warrington 
Longford Mills, Ramara, Ontario (Neighborhood)
Longford River

Louth

Louth, Lincolnshire
Louth, New South Wales
Louth, Ontario
Louth Bay, South Australia

Mayo

Mayo, Florida
Mayo, Kentucky
Mayo, Maryland
Mayo, Quebec 
Mayo, South Carolina
Mayo, Yukon
Mayo Lake, Person County, North Carolina
Mayo Peak, Antarctica
Mayo River, North Carolina

Moorefield

 Moorefield, Arkansas
 Moorefield, Indiana
 Moorefield, Kentucky
 Moorefield, Nebraska
 Moorefield, Ohio
 Moorefield, Ontario
 Moorefield, West Virginia

Munster

Munster, Haut-Rhin
Munster, Illinois
Munster, Indiana
Munster, KwaZulu-Natal
Munster, Lower Saxony
Munster, Moselle
Munster, Ottawa, Ontario (Neighborhood)
Munster, Western Australia
Munster Township, Pennsylvania

Shannon

Lake Shannon, Washington
Shannon, Alabama
Shannon, Georgia
Shannon, Illinois
Shannon, Kansas
Shannon, Kentucky
Shannon, Mississippi
Shannon, North Carolina
Shannon, New Brunswick
Shannon, New Zealand
Shannon, Quebec
Shannon, Tasmania
Shannon, Texas
Shannon County, Missouri
Shannon Creek, Washington
Shannon Falls, British Columbia
Shannon Island, Greenland 
Shannon River, Minnesota
Shannon River, Western Australia

Tyrone

Lower Tyrone Township, Fayette County, Pennsylvania
Tyrone, Colorado
Tyrone, Coshocton County, Ohio
Tyrone, Georgia
Tyrone, Iowa
Tyrone, Kentucky
Tyrone, Missouri
Tyrone, Morrow County, Ohio
Tyrone, New Mexico
Tyrone, New York
Tyrone, Oklahoma
Tyrone, Ontario 
Tyrone, Pennsylvania
Tyrone, West Virginia
Tyrone, Wisconsin
Tyrone Township, Adams County, Pennsylvania
Tyrone Township, Blair County, Pennsylvania
Tyrone Township, Kent County, Michigan
Tyrone Township, Livingston County, Michigan
Tyrone Township, Perry County, Pennsylvania
Upper Tyrone Township, Fayette County, Pennsylvania

Waterford

New Waterford, Nova Scotia
Waterford, California
Waterford, Connecticut
Waterford, Digby, Nova Scotia
Waterford, Hertfordshire
Waterford, Knox County, Ohio
Waterford, Indiana
Waterford, Maine
Waterford, New York
Waterford, Ontario
Waterford, Pennsylvania
Waterford, Queensland
Waterford, Rhode Island
Waterford, Vermont
Waterford, Virginia
Waterford, Washington County, Ohio
Waterford, Western Australia
Waterford, Wisconsin
Waterford Parish, New Brunswick

Wexford

Wexford, Pennsylvania
Wexford, Toronto, Ontario (Neighborhood)
Wexford County, Michigan
Wexford Township, Michigan

Africa

South Africa
Athlone, Cape Town
Bantry Bay, Cape Town
Belfast, South Africa
Caledon, Western Cape
Caledon River, South Africa

Sierra Leone
Dublin, Banana Islands, Sierra Leone

Zimbabwe
Cashel, Zimbabwe
Killarney, Zimbabwe

Europe

France

 Ranelagh (Paris Métro)

Spain

 O'Donnell (Madrid Metro)
 Calle de O'Donnell

United Kingdom (excluding Northern Ireland)

England 
Beckery, Somerset (from Bec Eriu, Old Irish for "Little Ireland"; the name was likely brought to England by an Irishman recruited by Vikings)
Ranelagh Gardens

Scotland 
The following come from the Scottish Gaelic Èireann meaning "Ireland":
Auldearn (Allt Èireann)
Bridge of Earn (Drochaid Èireann)
Findhorn (Inbhir Èireann)
Loch Earn (Loch Èireann)
Lochearnhead (Ceann Loch Èireann)
Strathearn (Srath Èireann)

The following come from Fódla, Banbha and Eilg, which are poetic names for Ireland:
Atholl (Athfhotla)
Banff (Banbha)
Elgin (Eilginn)
Glenelg (Gleann Eilg)

Canada

Alberta 

Athlone, Edmonton
Avonmore, Edmonton
Bantry
Connemara
Erin Estates
Innisfree
Kildare, Edmonton
Kilkenny, Edmonton

Manitoba 

Killarney, Manitoba

New Brunswick 

Carlingford, New Brunswick
New Bandon Parish, New Brunswick
New Bandon-Salmon Beach
Wicklow Parish, New Brunswick

Newfoundland and Labrador 

Ballyhack, Newfoundland and Labrador

Nova Scotia 

Antrim, Nova Scotia
Castlereagh, Nova Scotia
Lismore, Nova Scotia
Londonderry, Nova Scotia
New Ross, Nova Scotia
New Waterford, Nova Scotia

Nunavut 

Lougheed Island

Ontario 

Aughrim, Dawn-Euphemia
Bailieboro
Ballycroy, Adjala-Tosorontio
Ballyduff, Kawartha Lakes
Ballymote, Middlesex Centre
Beechmount
Caledon
Carlingford
Carlow/Mayo
Cashel
Cavan-Monaghan
Coleraine
Corktown, Toronto
Connaught, Adamston/Bromley
Connaught, North Dundas
Connaught, Timmins
Donegal
Dundalk
Dublin 
Enniskillen
Erin
Erindale, Mississauga
Fermoy
Galway-Cavendish-Harvey
 Keady
 Kilbride
Killaloe, Hagarty and Richards
Killarney
Kilrush
Kinsale
Leitrim
Letterkenny
Limerick
Limerick Lake
Listowel
Lucan
Malahide
Maynooth
Moorefield
Navan
Newry
Otonabee–South Monaghan
Smith-Ennismore-Lakefield
Tramore
Tudor and Cashel
Tullamore
Tyrone
Waterford
Westmeath
Westmeath Provincial Park
Wicklow

Prince Edward Island 

 Kildare, Prince Edward Island
 Kildare Capes, Prince Edward Island

Quebec 

Armagh, Quebec
Saint-Ambroise-de-Kildare, Quebec
Sainte-Marcelline-de-Kildare, Quebec

Saskatchewan 

Erindale, Saskatoon
Limerick 
Meath Park
Mullingar

Mexico
 Murphy, Santa Fe
 Plaza Irlanda
 Casey

United States

Alabama 

 Ardmore	
 Bangor
 Dublin
 Killen
 Shannon

Arizona 

Cork

Arkansas 

 Avoca
 Moorefield

California 

 Athlone
 Bangor
 Belfast
 Dublin
Menlo Park
 Waterford

Colorado 

 Tyrone

Connecticut 

 Waterford

Florida 

 Avoca
 Dublin
 Killarney
 Mayo

Georgia 

 Ardmore, Atlanta
 Belfast
 Cork
 Dublin
 Killarney
 Limerick
Menlo
 Shannon
 Tyrone

Idaho 

 Rathdrum

Illinois 

 Avoca Township
 Clare
 Derry Township
 Limerick
 Munster
 Shannon
Tyrone Township

Indiana 

 Ardmore
 Avoca
 Clare
 Dublin
 Ireland
 Moorefield
 Munster
 New Ross
 Waterford

Iowa 

 Avoca
 Bangor
 Bangor Township
Clare
Menlo
 Tyrone
 Wexford Creek

Kansas 

 Boyle
 Clare
 Clonmel
 Longford
Menlo
 Shannon

Kentucky 

Avoca, Louisville
 Boyle
Cork
 Dublin
 Dunmor
Ennis
 Limerick, Louisville
 Mayo
 Moorefield
 Shannon
 Tyrone

Louisiana 

 Derry
 Killarney (Ferriday)

Maine 

 Bangor
 Belfast
 Limerick
 New Limerick
 Newry
 Waterford

Maryland 

 Ardmore
Baltimore County
Baltimore
 Carney
 Dublin
 Dundalk
Dundalk Historic District
 Mallows Bay
 Mayo
 Sligo Creek

Massachusetts 

Charlemont
 Colrain

Michigan 

 Antrim County
 Antrim Township
 Bangor
 Bangor Township, Bay County
 Bangor Township, Van Buren County
 Carney
 Clare
 Clare County
Corktown Historic District, Detroit
 Dublin
 Roscommon
 Roscommon County
Tyrone Township, Kent County
Tyrone Township, Livingston County
 Waterford Township
 Wexford County
 Wexford Township

Minnesota 

 Antrim Township
 Avoca
 Bandon Township
 Bangor Township
Belfast Township
 Bray Township
 Cashel Township
 Clontarf
 Coleraine
 Dublin Township
 Erin Lake
 Fermoy
Glendalough State Park
Kildare Township
 Kilkenny
Kilkenny Township
 Newry Township
 Shannon River
Tara Township, Swift County
Tara Township, Traverse County

Mississippi 

 Boyle
 Shannon

Missouri 

 Ardmore
 Belfast
 Brays
 Carlow
 Dublin
 Shannon County
 Sligo
 Tyrone

Montana 

Carney
Ennis

Nebraska 

 Avoca
 Belfast
 Moorefield

New Hampshire 

 Antrim
 Derry
 Dublin
 Kilkenny
 Londonderry
 Stewartstown

New Jersey 

 Hackettstown
Menlo Park

New Mexico 

 Derry
 Tyrone

New York 

 Avoca (town)
 Avoca (village)
 Bangor
 Belfast
 Clare
 Erin
 Galway (town)
 Galway (village)
 Limerick
Tipperary Hill, Syracuse
Tyrone
 Ulster County
 Ulster
 Waterford

North Carolina 

 Ardmore Historic District
 Colerain
 Dublin
 Mayo River
 Mount Mourne 
 Shannon
 Sligo

North Dakota 

 Bantry
 Fingal
 Kenmare

Ohio 

Antrim
Antrim Township
 Belfast, Clermont County
 Belfast, Highland County
 Colerain
 Colerain Township, Belmont County
 Colerain Township, Hamilton County
 Colerain Township, Ross County
 Dublin
 Dublin Township
 Limerick
Londonderry, Guernsey County
 Londonderry, Ross County
 Moorefield
 Sligo
 Tyrone, Coshocton County
 Tyrone, Morrow County
 Waterford, Knox County
 Waterford, Washington County

Oklahoma 

 Ardmore
 Bray
 Carney
 Kildare
 Tyrone

Oregon 

 Bandon
 Derry

Pennsylvania 

Antrim
Antrim Township
 Ardmore
 Armagh
 Armagh Township
Avoca
 Avonmore
 Bangor
 Belfast
 Belfast Township
 Colerain Township, Bedford County
 Colerain Township, Lancaster County
 Derry
 Derry Township, Dauphin County
 Derry Township, Mifflin County
 Derry Township, Montour County
 Derry Township, Westmoreland County
 Donegal
 Donegal Township, Butler County
 Donegal Township, Washington County
 Donegal Township, Westmoreland County
 Drumore Township/East Drumore Township 
Dublin
Dublin Township, Fulton County
Dublin Township, Huntingdon County
Duncannon
 Dunmore
East Donegal Township/West Donegal Township
 Fermanagh Township
 Letterkenny Township
 Limerick Township
 Lisburn
 Londonderry Township, Bedford County
 Londonderry Township, Chester County
 Londonderry Township, Dauphin County
Lower Tyrone Township/Upper Tyrone Township
 Lurgan Township
 Monaghan Township
 Munster Township
 Newry
 North Londonderry Township/South Londonderry Township
North Strabane Township/South Strabane Township
 Sligo
 Stewartstown
Tyrone
Tyrone Township, Adams County
Tyrone Township, Blair County
Tyrone Township, Perry County
 Ulster Township
 Upper Dublin Township
 Warrenpoint
 Waterford
 Wexford

Rhode Island 

 Waterford

South Carolina 

 Mayo
 Newry

South Dakota 

 Ardmore

Tennessee 

 Ardmore
 Belfast
 Erin

Texas 

 Avoca
 Dublin
 Ennis
 Erin
 Kildare
 Shannon

Vermont 

Baltimore
 Lake Dunmore
Londonderry
 Waterford

Virginia 

 Dublin
Dungannon
 Kinsale
 Mallow
 Waterford

Washington 

Kerry Park, Seattle
 Lake Shannon
 Shannon Creek

West Virginia 

 Avoca
Carney
 Dunmore
Ennis
 Ireland
 Moorefield
 Stewartstown
 Tralee
 Tyrone

Wisconsin 

 Avoca
 Bangor
 Erin
 Kildare
Neenah
 Newry
 Tyrone
 Waterford

Australia

New South Wales 

Avoca
Avoca Beach
Avoca Lake
Bangor
Ballina
Bantry Bay
Carlingford
Castlereagh
Castlereagh Highway
Castlereagh Nature Reserve
Castlereagh Street, Sydney
Cavan
Clontarf
 Dunmore
Fingal Bay
Fingal Head
Killarney Heights
Killarney Vale
Lismore
Londonderry
Louth
North Avoca
Point Clare
Rathmines
Tralee
Tullamore

Northern Territory 

Caledon Bay
Cape Londonderry

Queensland 

Charleville
Clontarf
Derrymore
Glanmire
Innisfail
Kerry
Killaloe
Killarney
Maryborough (Maryborough being the old name of Portlaoise)
Mount Enniskillen
Rathdowney
Tyrconnel
Waterford

South Australia 

Armagh
Cavan
Clare
Clare Valley
Dublin
Erindale
Glandore
Kilkenny

Tasmania 

Fingal, Tasmania
Howth, Tasmania
Liffey, Tasmania
Liffey River Reserve
Longford, Tasmania
Ross, Tasmania

Victoria 

Athlone, Victoria
Cape Clear, Victoria
Castlemaine, Victoria
Coleraine, Victoria
Drumcondra, Victoria
Killarney, Victoria
Kilmore, Victoria
Longford, Victoria
Maryborough, Victoria
Newry, Victoria
Portarlington, Victoria

Western Australia 

Glendalough
Leinster
Londonderry
Mullingar
Munster
Waterford

New Zealand

Ardmore
Avoca
Avoca River (Canterbury)
Avoca River (Hawke's Bay)
Belfast
Clifden
Shannon
Westport

Papua New Guinea

New Ireland (island)
New Ireland Province

South America

Argentina

 Ranelagh, Buenos Aires (Argentina)
 Duggan, Argentina
 O'Brien, Argentina
 Hurling Club, Buenos Aires

Chile
Vallenar, Chile (founded as "San Ambrosio de Ballenary", after Ballynary in County Sligo)

Beyond Earth

Beltra crater, Mars
Clogh crater, Mars
Conamara Chaos Zone, Europa
Dromore crater, Mars
Fenagh crater, Mars
Glendore crater, Mars
Lismore crater, Mars
Louth crater, Mars
Navan crater, Mars
Tara crater, Mars
Wicklow crater, Mars

See also
 List of Ireland-related topics
 Scottish place names in other countries
 List of non-US places that have a US place named after them

References

Place names in other countries
Lists of place names
Irish language
Celtic language-related lists